X-linked retinitis pigmentosa GTPase regulator-interacting protein 1 is a protein in the ciliary transition zone that in humans is encoded by the RPGRIP1 gene. RPGRIP1 is a multi-domain protein containing a coiled-coil domain at the N-terminus, two C2 domains and a C-terminal RPGR-interacting domain (RID). Defects in the gene result in the Leber congenital amaurosis (LCA) syndrome and in the eye disease glaucoma.

Interactions 

RPGRIP1 has been shown to interact with Retinitis pigmentosa GTPase regulator. RPGRIP1 interacts with RPGR via its RPGR-interacting domain (RID), which folds into a C2 domain architecture and interacts with RPGR at three different locations: A β strand of the RID interacting with the large loop of RPGR, at a hydrophobic interaction site, and via the N-terminal region of the RID.

References

Further reading

External links 
 PDBe-KB provides an overview of all the structure information available in the PDB for Human X-linked retinitis pigmentosa GTPase regulator-interacting protein 1 (RPGRIP1)